Vajdahunyad is the Hungarian name for Hunedoara in Romania.

It may also refer to:

 The Castle of Vajdahunyad, in Hunedoara
 Vajdahunyad Castle, in Budapest, Hungary